Menegazzia dispora is a species of corticolous (bark-dwelling), foliose lichen from South America. It was first formally described in an 1876 publication of James Crombie, with authorship attributed to Finnish lichenologist William Nylander. The type specimen was collected as part of a scientific expedition to South America conducted on the Royal Navy survey vessel HMS Nassau. Rolf Santesson transferred it to the genus Menegazzia in 1942.

Lichen products that occur in Menegazzia dispora include atranorin, chloroatranorin, hypostictic acid, hypoconstictic acid, and α-acetylhypoconstictic acid.

See also
List of Menegazzia species

References

dispora
Lichen species
Lichens described in 1876
Lichens of South America
Taxa named by William Nylander (botanist)